David Carson may refer to:

David Carson (graphic designer) (born 1955), American graphic designer
David Carson (director), British television director
David Carson (climatologist), British climatologist
David Carson (footballer), English footballer